Cyrtopodium longibulbosum, the cana-cana, of the Ecuadorian Amazon and adjacent Peru and possibly Colombia is the largest Orchid species in the Western Hemisphere with large clusters of pseudobulbs each up to  in length by about  in width, yet it remained unknown to science until 1993.

This orchid is exceeded in size only by Grammatophyllum speciosum, The Golden Orchid (Dendrobium  discolor)  and Bulbophyllum beccarii.

References

longibulbosum